The penteconter (alt. spelling pentekonter, pentaconter, pentecontor or pentekontor; , pentēkónteros, "fifty-oared"), plural penteconters, was an ancient Greek galley in use since the archaic period. 

In an alternative meaning, the term was also used for a military commander of fifty men in ancient Greece.

History
The penteconters emerged in an era when there was no distinction between merchant ships and warships. They were versatile, long-range ships used for sea trade, piracy and warfare, capable of transporting freight or troops. A penteconter was rowed by fifty oarsmen, arranged in a row of twenty-five on each side of the ship. A midship mast with sail could also propel the ship under favourable wind. Penteconters were long and sharp-keeled ships, hence described as long vessels (nḗes makraí ). They typically lacked a full deck, and thus were also called unfenced vessels (áphraktoi nḗes).

Homer describes war ships during the Trojan War of various numbers of oars varying from twenty-oared, such as the ship that brought Chryseis back to her father, to fifty-oared, as Odysseus’ ship that had fifty-seven men and as many as 120 men of the Boeotian ships.

However, modern reconstructions of penteconters, as well as other ancient ship designs such as triremes, crewed by modern untrained amateurs, attained that top speed fairly easily on initial sea trials, which implies that the top speed of that type of ship in the ancient era had to be substantially higher. Ancient Greeks also used the triaconter or triacontor ( triakontoros), a shorter version of the penteconter with thirty oars. There is a general agreement that the trireme, the primary warship of classical antiquity, evolved from the penteconter via the bireme. The penteconter remained in use until the Hellenistic period, when it became complemented and eventually replaced by other designs, such as the lembus, the hemiolia and the liburnians.

See also
 Hellenistic-era warships
 Pentecopterus, a genus of eurypterid named after the penteconter.

References

Galleys
Ships of ancient Greece
Naval history of ancient Greece
Naval warfare of antiquity
Achaemenid navy